Group B of the 2005 Fed Cup Europe/Africa Zone Group I was one of four pools in the Europe/Africa Zone Group I of the 2005 Fed Cup. Four teams competed in a round robin competition, with the top team and the bottom team proceeding to their respective sections of the play-offs: the top team played for advancement to the World Group II Play-offs, while the bottom team faced potential relegation to Group II.

Sweden vs. Luxembourg

Netherlands vs. Poland

Sweden vs. Netherlands

Luxembourg vs. Poland

Sweden vs. Poland

Netherlands vs. Luxembourg

See also
Fed Cup structure

References

External links
 Fed Cup website

2005 Fed Cup Europe/Africa Zone